Grete Rehor (30 June 1910 – 28 January 1987), born in Vienna, was an Austrian politician belonging to the Austrian People's Party. She was Minister of Social Affairs from 1966 to 1970, and was the first female government minister in Austria.

Sources 

Anton Burghardt (Hrsg.): Soziale Sicherheit und politische Verantwortung. Festschrift für Grete Rehor Verein für Sozial- und Wirtschaftspolitik, Wien 1975.

Austrian women in politics
1910 births
1987 deaths
Government ministers of Austria
Women government ministers of Austria
Burials at Ottakring Cemetery